Kamal Nath Tewari (29 March 1907 – 17 January 1974) was an Indian politician. He was elected to the Lok Sabha, the lower house of the Parliament of India from Bettiah, Bihar as a member of the Indian National Congress. He was a freedom fighter and was imprisoned by the British in 1941 and again from 1942-46.

References

External links
Official biographical sketch on the Parliament of India website

1907 births
1974 deaths
Indian National Congress politicians
Lok Sabha members from Bihar
India MPs 1962–1967
India MPs 1967–1970
India MPs 1971–1977
Indian National Congress politicians from Bihar